Quinebaug is a village and census-designated place (CDP) in Thompson, a town in Windham County, Connecticut, United States. The population was 1,133 at the 2010 census.

Geography
According to the United States Census Bureau, the CDP has a total area of 11.8 km (4.5 mi2).  11.3 km (4.4 mi2) of it is land and 0.4 km (0.2 mi2) of it (3.74%) is water. The CDP is located where the Quinebaug River enters Connecticut from Massachusetts.

Demographics
As of the census of 2000, there were 1,122 people, 454 households, and 310 families residing in the CDP.  The population density was 99.4/km (257.1/mi2).  There were 476 housing units at an average density of 42.2/km (109.1/mi2).  The racial makeup of the CDP was 98.31% White, 1.16% African American, 0.18% Native American, 0.27% Asian, and 0.09% from two or more races. Hispanic or Latino of any race were 0.09% of the population.

There were 454 households, out of which 28.4% had children under the age of 18 living with them, 57.5% were married couples living together, 7.3% had a female householder with no husband present, and 31.7% were non-families. 26.7% of all households were made up of individuals, and 13.0% had someone living alone who was 65 years of age or older.  The average household size was 2.47 and the average family size was 3.01.

In the CDP the population was spread out, with 22.5% under the age of 18, 6.0% from 18 to 24, 26.5% from 25 to 44, 24.7% from 45 to 64, and 20.3% who were 65 years of age or older.  The median age was 41 years. For every 100 females, there were 104.4 males.  For every 100 females age 18 and over, there were 97.5 males.

The median income for a household in the CDP was $37,614, and the median income for a family was $51,667. Males had a median income of $37,292 versus $29,375 for females. The per capita income for the CDP was $20,615.  None of the families and 4.1% of the population were living below the poverty line, including no under eighteens and 4.8% of those over 64.

References

Census-designated places in Windham County, Connecticut
Connecticut placenames of Native American origin
Thompson, Connecticut
Villages in Connecticut